Florida's 2nd House District elects one member of the Florida House of Representatives. The district is represented by Alex Andrade. This district is located in the Florida Panhandle and encompasses part of the Emerald Coast. The district covers the southern portion of Escambia County and a small part of Santa Rosa County. The district is anchored on Pensacola, its largest city, and contains part of its metropolitan area. As of the 2010 Census, the district's population is 155,932.

This district contains Naval Air Station Pensacola and Pensacola International Airport. The district also contains Pensacola State College and Pensacola Christian College, both located in Pensacola.

There was a vacancy between March 13, 2013 and March 4, 2014 due to the death of incumbent Clay Ford. Mike Hill, the president of the Northwest Florida Tea Party, won a special election to fill the seat.

Representatives from 1967 to the present

See also 

Florida's 1st Senate district
 Florida's 1st congressional district

References 

02
Escambia County, Florida
Pensacola, Florida
Santa Rosa County, Florida